Cora arborescens is a species of basidiolichen in the family Hygrophoraceae. It was formally described as a new species in 2016 by Manuela Dal Forno, José Luis Chaves, and Robert Lücking. The specific epithet arborescens refers to its growth on trees. The lichen is only known from the type locality near Cerro de la Muerte in Costa Rica.

References

arborescens
Lichen species
Lichens described in 2016
Lichens of Central America
Taxa named by Robert Lücking
Basidiolichens